The Marian Apartments, also known as Marian Flats, is a historic apartment building located at Lafayette, Tippecanoe County, Indiana.  It was designed by Oliver W. Pierce, Jr. and built in 1907.  It is a three-story, rectangular, brick building with limestone and wood trim.  It features polygonal three-story projecting bays.

They were listed on the National Register of Historic Places in 1983.

References

Apartment buildings in Indiana
Residential buildings on the National Register of Historic Places in Indiana
Residential buildings completed in 1907
Buildings and structures in Lafayette, Indiana
National Register of Historic Places in Tippecanoe County, Indiana